The 1953 South Carolina Gamecocks football team represented the University of South Carolina as a member of the Atlantic Coast Conference (ACC) during the 1953 college football season. Led by 13th-year head coach Rex Enright, the Gamecocks compiled an overall record of 7–3 with a mark of 2–3 in conference play, placing in a three-way tie for third in the ACC. The team played home games at Carolina Stadium in Columbia, South Carolina.

1953 was the ACC's inaugural year of competition. South Carolina and six other schools from the Southern Conference (SoCon) broke off to form the new conference in 1953.

Schedule

References

South Carolina
South Carolina Gamecocks football seasons
South Carolina Gamecocks football